The 1994 ICF World Junior Canoe Slalom Championships were the 5th edition of the ICF World Junior Canoe Slalom Championships. The event took place in Wausau, Wisconsin, United States from 28 to 31 July 1994 under the auspices of the International Canoe Federation (ICF).

Seven medal events took place. No medals were awarded for the C2 team event.

Medal summary

Men

Canoe

Kayak

Women

Kayak

Medal table

References

External links
International Canoe Federation

ICF World Junior Canoe Slalom Championships
ICF World Junior and U23 Canoe Slalom Championships
Sports in Wausau, Wisconsin